KEHK (102.3 FM) is a commercial radio station licensed to Brownsville, Oregon, and serving the Eugene-Springfield radio market.  It is owned by Cumulus Media and airs a hot adult contemporary radio format, using the moniker "Star 102.3."  Studios and offices are on Executive Parkway in Eugene.  The transmitter is off Blanton Road, also in Eugene, among several other FM and TV station towers.

History
On April 1, 1991 the station first signed on as KGAL-FM.  It was owned by Eads Broadcasting Corporation, along with AM 920 KSHO in Lebanon, Oregon. KGAL-FM aired a satellite oldies format, using the "Kool Gold" service.  At first it was only powered at 6,000 watts, a fraction of its power today, and did not significantly reach the Eugene-Springfield market.

In 1994, it moved to its current transmitter site with an adult album alternative format as “Clear 102.3” and changed its call sign to KLRF.  In 1996, it switched to classic hits as “102.3 The Hawk” and its current call letters KEHK.  In 2003, it changed to “Star 102.3” with its hot adult contemporary format.

Personalities
The Bert Show, mornings
All Music Middays, middays
Brian Roberts, afternoons/Program Director
Nights Live w/Adam Bomb, Nights

References

External links
Official Website

Official Website for John Tesh

EHK
Hot adult contemporary radio stations in the United States
Adult top 40 radio stations in the United States
Radio stations established in 1972
1972 establishments in Oregon
Brownsville, Oregon
Cumulus Media radio stations